"Stay" is the second single by American rock band SafetySuit, off of their debut studio album Life Left to Go.

It has peaked at #44 on the Billboard Heatseekers Songs, #92 on the Pop 100 chart, and #17 on the Hot Adult Top 40 Tracks chart.

Music video 
A music video was released on April 23, 2009, directed by Zack Merck. The video starts off with Doug Brown in a room with a bloody mouth.  It then shows Doug with a woman driving a car on a desert road.  It switches to this story and the band playing outside a motel throughout the video.  Later on in the video, they are in a room at the motel.  When the woman leaves the room Doug notices a large amount of money in her luggage bag. He is visibly upset when she enters the room. She is happy as she tosses him a stack of hundreds. He then shows her his police badge, which makes her shocked and upset. As she tries to leave, Doug stops her, handing her rope. She is distraught as she proceeds to tie him to a chair. She then hits Doug with a sculpture of an eagle. He is shown bleeding as he was at the beginning of the video.  She then kisses Doug and leaves. After a short time, police show up to the scene and untie him. They look at him and he shakes his head no.  The video ends as the police are leaving and Doug gets in a car.

Chart performance

References

2008 songs
2009 singles
SafetySuit songs
Universal Motown Records singles